The Lower Saxony Football Association, the NFV, is one of 21 state organisations of the German Football Association, the DFB, and covers the state of Lower Saxony.

Overview

The NFV is also part of the Northern German Football Association, one of five regional federations in Germany. The other members of the regional association are the Bremen Football Association, the Hamburg Football Association and the Schleswig-Holstein Football Association.

In 2017, the NFV had 642,556 members, 2,661 member clubs and 17,975 teams playing in its league system. It is the third-largest of the German state associations.

References

External links
 DFB website  
 NFV website  
 NFV website 

Football in Lower Saxony
Football governing bodies in Germany
1947 establishments in Germany